Protemus is an unincorporated community in Calloway County, Kentucky, United States.

References

Unincorporated communities in Calloway County, Kentucky
Unincorporated communities in Kentucky